Morton Road railway station was a station serving the village of Morton, Lincolnshire on the Great Northern Railway Bourne and Sleaford railway. It opened in 1872 and closed to passengers in 1930. The section from Bourne through Morton to Billingborough remained open for goods until 1965.

Following closure the station buildings and yard were used for a local crawler tractor distributor. The main building is now a private residence and a housing development Old Station Yard now occupies the rest of the site.

Route

References

External links
 Morton Road station on navigable 1946 O. S. map
 ; Morton Road station on 1891 OS map.

Disused railway stations in Lincolnshire
Former Great Northern Railway stations
Railway stations in Great Britain opened in 1872
Railway stations in Great Britain closed in 1930